Bill Copeland may refer to:

 Bill Copeland (umpire) (1929–2011), Australian Test cricket match umpire
 Bill Copeland (poet) (1946–2010), American poet, writer and historian
 Bill Copeland (sailor) (born 1928), Canadian sailor